Streptomyces melanosporofaciens is a bacterium species from the genus of Streptomyces which has been isolated from soil in Italy. Streptomyces melanosporofaciens produces elaiophylin, cyclooctatin, geldanamycin, chilaphylin and melanosporin.
A mutant of Streptomyces melanosporofaciens has the ability to protect potatoes from common scab.

See also 
 List of Streptomyces species

References

Further reading 
 
 
 
 
 

Rex, Astrid, and Luis Arrieta. "Chilaphylin, a new antibiotic produced by Streptomyces melanosporofaciens strain Chilea." The Journal of antibiotics 26.3 (1973): 126-130.
https://www.jstage.jst.go.jp/article/antibiotics1968/26/3/26_3_126/_pdf

External links
Type strain of Streptomyces melanosporofaciens at BacDive -  the Bacterial Diversity Metadatabase

melanosporofaciens
Bacteria described in 1959